NWFF can stand for:

 Ndiva Women's Film Festival, an African women's film festival
 New World First Ferry, a Hong Kong ferry service company